Anna Jullienne Kermode (born 7 November 1982) is a New Zealand actress, best known for her role as Nurse Maia Jeffries in the television series Shortland Street (2004-2012).

Career
Jullienne attended Corran School for Girls, and was active in drama, with lead roles in productions of Amadeus, Julius Caesar and Anything Goes, and she won several awards, including the 1999 NZ Young Performer of the Year, 1st prize in the 1999 Auckland National Independent Schools Speech Competition, and 1st prize in the Auckland Drama Championship at the North Shore Performing Arts Festival. In 2007, she won the Air New Zealand Screen Award for Performance by a Supporting Actress, for her role on Shortland Street.

Jullienne holds an ATCL Teacher Practical Certificate from the Trinity College of London Drama Examination, and studied camera technique under Jan Saussey. She is fluent in French and Japanese, as well as English.

Her professional career started during her time at the University of Auckland with roles in Mercy Peak and Secret Agent Men, and she put her studies (a BA in English and Film and TV) on hold to take up her first major dramatic screen role on Shortland Street. She took a six-month break from filming Shortland Street from October 2007 and left the show in late 2010 with Maia's last scene airing 9 February 2011. Throughout her career Jullienne has been a prominent spokeswoman and model for the Red 11 modelling agency. Jullienne has appeared in photo shoots for such brands as: NZ Performance Car, Red Bull, XCDR and Car50.

Controversy
The lesbian relationship in Shortland Street between Jullienne's character Maia and Jay (Jaime Passier-Armstrong), which was introduced in June 2004, has been controversial, although the overall response has been positive. On 26 April 2005, New Zealand's Civil Union Act came into effect, which allowed both heterosexual and homosexual couples to register their relationships officially, as distinct from traditional marriage, and on 14 February 2006, the first fictional portrayal of a civil union on New Zealand television took place between Maia and Jay.

Personal life
In real life, Anna has close friendships with Fleur Saville, Faye Smythe, Beth Allen, Amanda Billing, Te Kohe Tuhaka and Alison Quigan.  She married commercial property manager James Kermode in 2010. She had her first child, a son (Theodore), in January 2014, her second son (Jude) in November 2016, and a daughter (Nina) in June 2021.

Filmography

References

External links
 

Living people
New Zealand television actresses
New Zealand people of French descent
1982 births
21st-century New Zealand actresses
University of Auckland alumni
New Zealand soap opera actresses